Agustín Alejandro Mazzilli (born 20 June 1989) is an Argentine field hockey player who plays as a midfielder or forward for Belgian Hockey League club Braxgata and the Argentine national team.

Club career
In Argentina, Mazzilli played for Lomas Athletic Club. His first club in Europe was KHC Leuven from Belgium. After two seasons with Leuven, he went to another Belgian club Royal Léopold, where he played for three seasons. In 2016 he transferred to HC Oranje-Rood in the Netherlands, where he signed a contract for two years. When his contract expired, he signed a 2-year contract for Pinoké from Amstelveen. After the 2020 Summer Olympics he returned to Belgium to play for Braxgata.

International career
Mazzilli was a part of Argentina's gold medal-winning team at the 2016 Olympics. At the 2012 Summer Olympics, he competed for the national team in the men's tournament. He has won the bronze medal at the 2014 Men's Hockey World Cup. In July 2019, he was selected in the Argentina squad for the 2019 Pan American Games. They won the gold medal by defeating Canada 5-2 in the final.

Honours

International
Argentina
Olympic Gold medal: 2016
Pan American Games: 2011, 2015, 2019
Pan American Cup: 2013, 2017
South American Games: 2014
South American Championship: 2010, 2013
Argentina U21
Pan American Junior Championship: 2008

Individual
Pan American Elite Team: 2017, 2019

References

External links

 Agustín Alejand Mazzilli at the 2019 Pan American Games

1989 births
Living people
Argentine male field hockey players
Argentine people of Italian descent
Male field hockey midfielders
2010 Men's Hockey World Cup players
Field hockey players at the 2011 Pan American Games
Field hockey players at the 2012 Summer Olympics
2014 Men's Hockey World Cup players
Field hockey players at the 2015 Pan American Games
Field hockey players at the 2016 Summer Olympics
2018 Men's Hockey World Cup players
Field hockey players at the 2019 Pan American Games
Olympic field hockey players of Argentina
Pan American Games gold medalists for Argentina
Olympic gold medalists for Argentina
Olympic medalists in field hockey
Medalists at the 2016 Summer Olympics
Pan American Games medalists in field hockey
South American Games gold medalists for Argentina
South American Games medalists in field hockey
HC Oranje-Rood players
Competitors at the 2014 South American Games
Men's Hoofdklasse Hockey players
Expatriate field hockey players
Argentine expatriate sportspeople in Belgium
Argentine expatriate sportspeople in the Netherlands
KHC Leuven players
Men's Belgian Hockey League players
Medalists at the 2011 Pan American Games
Medalists at the 2019 Pan American Games
Medalists at the 2015 Pan American Games
Royal Léopold Club players
Field hockey players at the 2020 Summer Olympics
Sportspeople from Buenos Aires Province
2023 Men's FIH Hockey World Cup players
21st-century Argentine people
Sportspeople from Lanús